Verónica Charlyn Corral Ang (born 11 September 1991) is a Mexican footballer who plays as a striker for Liga MX Femenil club CF Pachuca and the Mexico women's national team. She has previously played for Atlético Madrid in Spain, for Merilappi United in Finland and for the University of Louisville's college soccer team in the United States.

Club career
After scoring 23 goals for Levante in her debut 2015–16 season, Corral signed a one-year extension to her contract with the Spanish club. She had been named in the Primera División's Team of the Season. She left the side in 2019.

International career
Corral made her debut for the Mexico U-21 team in 2006 at the age of 14. She was a member of the Mexico squad at the 2006, 2008 and 2010 FIFA U-20 Women's World Cup. In 2006, Corral was the top scorer at the CONCACAF Women's U-20 Championship. Corral earned her first cap for the Mexico women's national football team at the 2011 FIFA Women's World Cup in a group stage match against New Zealand.

Personal life
Charlyn's brother George Corral is also an international footballer, who currently plays for Club Puebla.

Controversies
On June 19, 2015, Corral was reported to have called for the replacement of Leonardo Cuellar, long-time coach of the Mexico women's national team. Corral was not on the roster for the 2015 Pan American Games and the qualifying matches for the 2015 Women's World Cup. Cuellar stepped down as coach in 2016 and in 2017 Corral was again selected for the roster of the national team.

References

External links
 
 
 

1991 births
Living people
Women's association football forwards
Mexican women's footballers
Footballers from the State of Mexico
People from Ecatepec de Morelos
Mexico women's international footballers
2011 FIFA Women's World Cup players
2015 FIFA Women's World Cup players
Pan American Games competitors for Mexico
Footballers at the 2019 Pan American Games
Universiade silver medalists for Mexico
Universiade medalists in football
Louisville Cardinals women's soccer players
Kansallinen Liiga players
Merilappi United players
Primera División (women) players
Levante UD Femenino players
Atlético Madrid Femenino players
Mexican expatriate women's footballers
Mexican expatriate sportspeople in the United States
Expatriate women's soccer players in the United States
Mexican expatriate sportspeople in Finland
Expatriate women's footballers in Finland
Mexican expatriate sportspeople in Spain
Expatriate women's footballers in Spain
Medalists at the 2013 Summer Universiade
Mexican footballers